Wishbone Ridge is a Y-shaped ridge trending northeast from the main ridge of the Duncan Mountains. The feature is 2 nautical miles (3.7 km) east of Morris Peak and is unique among the series of ridges in the Duncan Mountains in that it bifurcates, giving an aerial view similar in shape to a "wishbone." The descriptive name was suggested by Edmund Stump of the United States Antarctic Research Program (USARP) Ohio State University field party who, with C.E. Corbatoo and P.V. Colbert, geologically mapped the ridge on December 21, 1974.

Ridges of the Ross Dependency
Amundsen Coast